The 1980 California Golden Bears football team was an American football team that represented the University of California, Berkeley during the 1980 NCAA Division I-A football season.	Under head coach Roger Theder, the team compiled an overall record of 3–8 and 3–5 in conference.

Schedule

Personnel

Season summary

Stanford

Cal made a goal-line stand with 1:07 remaining to preserve the victory.

References

California
California Golden Bears football seasons
California Golden Bears football